Akkar District is the only district in Akkar Governorate, Lebanon. The UNHCR estimated the population of the district to be 389,899 in 2015, including 106,935 registered refugees of the Syrian Civil War and 19,404 Palestinian refugees. The capital is at Halba.

The district is characterized by the presence of a relatively large coastal plain, with high mountains to the east. The largest cities in Akkar are Halba, Bire Akkar and Al-Qoubaiyat.

Akkar has many important Roman and Arabic archaeological sites. One of the most famous archaeological sites and the birthplace of the Roman emperor Severus Alexander (d.235) is the Tell of Arqa near the town of Miniara. Several prehistoric sites were found in the Akkar plain foothills that were suggested to have been used by the Heavy Neolithic Qaraoun culture at the dawn of the Neolithic Revolution.

Akkar can be divided into 7 parts: Qaitea (القيطع), Jouma (الجومة), Dreib (الدريب), Jabal Akroum (جبل أكروم), Wadi Khaled (وادي خالد), Cheft (الشفت) and As-Sahel (السهل).

History 
2021 Akkar explosion killed dozens of people.

Geography 
Akkar is divided into the following regions:

 Al-Jouma: represents multiple villages connected to each other by a network of roads, and is located around fertile land that enable it to adopt greenhouse and fruit crops.

 Najd Akkar: It is divided into three sub-regions according to the geographical situation that makes the crops change according to the height and irrigation: Al-Shafat, Al-Dreib Al-Awsat, Al-Dreib Al-A'la

 The plateaus where the al-Qayt'a region is.

 Jarad Akkar: It occupies an area in the east of the entire region, starting from the borders of the Akkar governorate to Abu Musa River in the south to the Syrian border in the north, and it consists of the following villages.

 The plain: in itself it is the source of agricultural wealth, where its inhabitants live from the land, and 6% of the properties include half of the lands.

Demographics
The majority of the residents in the Akkar District is composed by a majority of Sunni Muslims, followed by a large minority of Greek Orthodox Christians. Maronites are the second largest Christian denomination, and have typically lived around the city of Al-Qoubaiyat. Melkite Christians are also present in small numbers in the region.

This region is also home to the largest population of Alawites in Lebanon.

Turkish people form a majority in Kouachra and Aydamun.

References

 
Districts of Lebanon